Pamuru is a mandal in the Prakasam district in the Coastal Andhra region of Andhra Pradesh, India.

Villages in Prakasam district